Prochola catacentra is a moth of the family Agonoxenidae. It is found in Brazil.

References

Moths described in 1922
Agonoxeninae
Moths of South America
Taxa named by Edward Meyrick